Royal Ralph Hinman (June 20, 1785 – October 16, 1868) was an American lawyer and antiquarian who held various public offices in Connecticut, and who wrote on antiquarian subjects.

Biography

Royal Ralph Hinman was born in 1785 in Southbury, Connecticut, the son of General Ephraim Hinman, a successful Connecticut merchant, and Sylvania (French) Hinman. 
He graduated Yale College in 1804, and Litchfield Law School in 1806, where he studied law with David Sherman Boardman and Noah B. Benedict.
In 1808 he was admitted to the bar in Litchfield County Court, and began to practice law in Roxbury, Connecticut.

In 1814, Hinman married Lydia Ashley Hinman.
He was elected a Connecticut State Representative in 1814, 1825 and 1831.
He was Postmaster of Roxbury from 1823 to 1833, and was Secretary of the State of Connecticut from 1825 to 1842.
Between 1835 and 1836 he was a member of the Committee to Revise Public Statutes of Connecticut.
In September 1844, the Port of New Haven appointed him the Collector of Customs.

Works

The Committee to Revise Public Statutes of Connecticut included Hinman, Leman Church and the Hon. Elisha Phelps.
Between 1835 and 1836 they compiled and published 1640 pages on the private of special acts of the state.
In 1838 Hinman and Thomas Clap Perkins revised and published the Statutes of Connecticut Revisions of 1838, in 717 pages.  
Hinman was a member of the Connecticut, Massachusetts, and New Jersey state historical societies. 
He published many historical works including the Antiquities of Connecticut and A Historical Collection of the Part Sustained by Connecticut During the War of the Revolution. 
He contributed many Connecticut articles to The New England Historical and Genealogical Register during its early years. His Catalogue of the Names of the First Puritan Settlers of the Colony of Connecticut was deemed of sufficient importance to be republished in 2015 (with a revised title) by the New England Historic Genealogical Society.

Bibliography

Notes and references
Citations

Sources

1785 births
1868 deaths
People from Southbury, Connecticut
Connecticut lawyers
Secretaries of the State of Connecticut
Members of the Connecticut House of Representatives
Yale University alumni
Litchfield Law School alumni
19th-century American politicians
People from Roxbury, Connecticut
19th-century American lawyers